So Do I may refer to:

 "So Do I", 1932 song heard in Take a Chance (musical)
 "So Do I", 1936 song by Bing Crosby, also heard in Pennies from Heaven (1936 film)
 "So Do I", 2001 song by Christy Moore from This Is the Day (album)
 "So Do I", song by Johnny Cash first recorded in 1961 and then released in The Unissued Johnny Cash, the 1978 compilation of unreleased or rare songs
 "So Do I?", 2010 song by Shamrock (band) from Shamrock

See also 

 "And So Do I", 1998 song by Ivor Cutler from A Flat Man
 También Yo, album by Daniela Romo, also known as So Do I or So Am I
 "So Do I Say Sorry First?", 2007 song by Stephanie McIntosh
 So Am I (disambiguation)